This is a list of events from British radio in 1949.

Events
9 January – The death today in London of comedian Tommy Handley is announced after the Sunday evening repeat of his popular series It's That Man Again by the Director General of the BBC, Sir William Haley, who insists on making the announcement himself; ITMA is immediately cancelled and succeeded by Ray's a Laugh with Ted Ray, while Take It from Here takes over its repeat slot.
28 March – Astronomer Fred Hoyle coins the term Big Bang during a BBC Third Programme broadcast.

Debuts
31 January – A Book at Bedtime (1949–Present)
6 March – Billy Cotton Band Show (1949–1968)
4 April – Ray's a Laugh (1949–1961)

Continuing radio programmes

1930s
 In Town Tonight (1933–1960)

1940s
 Music While You Work (1940–1967)
 Sunday Half Hour (1940–2018)
 Desert Island Discs (1942–Present)
 Family Favourites (1945–1980)
 Down Your Way (1946–1992)
 Have A Go (1946–1967)
 Housewives' Choice (1946–1967)
 Letter from America (1946–2004)
 Woman's Hour (1946–Present)
 Twenty Questions (1947–1976)
 Any Questions? (1948–Present)
 Mrs Dale's Diary (1948–1969)
 Take It from Here (1948–1960)

Ending this year
6 January – It's That Man Again (1939–1949)

Births
7 February – Les Ross, né Meakin, midlands DJ
12 March – David Mellor, politician and radio presenter
2 April – Paul Gambaccini, American-born music presenter
20 April – Paul Heiney, broadcaster
29 May – Michael Berkeley, composer and music broadcaster
7 August – Matthew Parris, South African-born political writer and broadcaster, previously MP
2 September – Moira Stuart, broadcast presenter
25 November – Isabel Hilton, Scottish-born journalist and broadcaster
12 December – Bill Nighy, actor
 Philip Dodd, creative arts academic and broadcaster
 David Stafford, writer and broadcaster

Deaths
9 January – Tommy Handley, comedian (born 1892)
10 June – Sir Frederick Ogilvie, broadcasting executive and university administrator (born 1893)
9 July – Peter Waring, comedian and fraudster, suicide (born 1916)

See also 
 1949 in British music
 1949 in British television
 1949 in the United Kingdom
 List of British films of 1949

References 

 
Years in British radio
Radio